Luise Catharina Amalie Zietz (née: Körner) (1865–1922) was a German socialist and feminist. She was the first woman to occupy a leading party post in Germany. She also helped bring the socialist women's movement into the Social Democratic Party of Germany.

In 1908, the same year the government legalized women's participation in politics, she became the first woman appointed to the executive committee of the Social Democratic Party of Germany. She later nominated Marie Juchacz for a paid position by the party as the Cologne women's secretary in what was then the Upper Rhine province.

Zietz and Friedrich Ebert, Hugo Haase, Hermann Molkenbuhr and Hermann Müller attended the Vienna Socialist Conference of 1915 representing the Social Democratic Party of Germany.

In 1917 she was one of the main agitators in favor of a split in the party, which led to the formation of the Independent Social Democratic Party of Germany. She then became a leader in the creation of that party's women's movement.

She was one of the first female members of the new Reichstag in 1919.

References

1865 births
1922 deaths
German feminists
German socialists
German women's rights activists
Members of the Weimar National Assembly
Social Democratic Party of Germany politicians
Socialist feminists
20th-century German women politicians